Kachin United Football Club is a Burmese football club based in Myitkyina Township, Kachin and founded in 2014. At first, they played under the name Pong Gan FC since 2015.  In 2018 MNL-2 season, Pong Gan FC name changed to Kachin United Football Club. After 2022 MNL-2, The MNL-2 Champion, University and the runner-up, Junior Lions cannot qualify to MNL for Club criteria. MNL Committee provided Dagon Star United and Kachin United to play in 2023 Myanmar National League. 2023 Myanmar National League is their first time ever play for MNL-1.

2023 Final squad

References

External links

Football clubs in Myanmar
Association football clubs established in 2009
Myanmar National League clubs
2009 establishments in Myanmar